Actua is a Canadian charitable organization that delivers science, engineering and technology educational programs to young people in Canada.

The organization is a member of the Science and Technology Awareness Network (S.T.A.N.). Actua's president and CEO is Jennifer E. Flanagan.

Organization

Programs 
Actua's programs use hands-on activities in fields such as health, mining, biology and ecology. The majority of member organizations also travel outside the urban centers where they are located to deliver camps and workshops in rural and remote communities.

The programs include:
National Mentorship Program
National Aboriginal Outreach Program
National Girls Program
Go Where Kids Are Program
In July 2021, Actua was awarded a $50,000 grant to develop "vaccine safety content" targeted towards students and teachers to combat vaccine hesitancy. The funding was administered jointly by the Canadian Institutes of Health Research, Natural Sciences and Engineering Research Council and Social Sciences and Humanities Research Council through the "Encouraging vaccine confidence in Canada" COVID-19 vaccine funding program.

Membership 
Actua operates on a membership structure, consisting of member organizations located at 31 university and college institutions across Canada. Actua's member programs are delivered by undergraduate and high school students through science camps and workshops, which are customized to the needs of local communities.

The program has 34 members throughout the various provinces and territories of Canada.

Alberta 
 Lethbridge: Destination Exploration at the University of Lethbridge
 Edmonton: DiscoverE at the University of Alberta
 Calgary: Minds in Motion at the University of Calgary
 Red Deer: Science Promotion at Red Deer College

British Columbia 
 Kamloops: EUReKA! Science Program at Thompson Rivers University
 Vancouver: GEERing Up! at the University of British Columbia
 Burnaby: Science AL!VE at Simon Fraser University
 Victoria: Science Venture at the University of Victoria

Manitoba 
 Brandon: Mini University at Brandon University
 Winnipeg: Eco-Kids at the University of Winnipeg and WISE Kid-Netic Energy at the University of Manitoba

New Brunswick 
 Fredericton: Worlds UNBound at the University of New Brunswick

Nova Scotia 
 Halifax: SuperNOVA at Dalhousie University
 Antigonish: X-Chem Outreach Program at St. Francis Xavier University

Nunavut 
 Iqaluit: Simply Science at the Nunavut Research Institute

Ontario 
 Ottawa: Adventures in Engineering and Science at the University of Ottawa and Virtual Ventures at Carleton University
 Guelph: Creative Encounters at the University of Guelph
 London: Discovery Western at the University of Western Ontario
 Toronto: Engineering Outreach at the University of Toronto and Science Explorations at York University
 Waterloo: ESQ at the University of Waterloo
 Kingston: ASUS Camps at Queen's University
 Thunder Bay: Superior Science at Lakehead University
 Hamilton: Venture Engineering and Science at McMaster University
 Brantford: SNP STEAM Academy at Six Nations Polytechnic

Quebec 
 Montreal: Folie Technique at École Polytechnique de Montréal
 Trois-Rivières: Génitrucs at Université du Québec à Trois-Rivières
 Laval: Musée Armand Frappier at Centre d'interprétation des Biosciences

Saskatchewan 
 Regina: EYES (Educating Youth in Engineering & Science) at the University of Regina and FNU Health and Science Camp at First Nations University of Canada
 Saskatoon: SCI-FI Science Camps at the University of Saskatchewan

Yukon 
 Whitehorse: Science Adventures at Yukon College

Awards 
In 2000, Actua was awarded the Michael Smith Award by the National Science and Engineering Research Council.

In 2000, Actua submitted its programs to an independent evaluation process to measure their programs' effectiveness. The three-year research initiative surveyed student participants who revealed their experience with Actua programs.

In 2009, the Ontario Trillium Foundation named Actua and its 11 Ontario members the winner of the Minister's Award recognizing not-for-profit organizations that have had "an exceptional impact in their communities."

References

External links 
 Official website

Charities based in Canada
Educational organizations based in Canada